Planogyra astericus, common name the eastern flat-whorl, is a species of small air-breathing land snail, a terrestrial pulmonate gastropod mollusk in the family Valloniidae.

This species is listed as of "Special Concern" in the U.S. state of Michigan.

References

Further reading 
 

Valloniidae
Molluscs of the United States
Gastropods described in 1857